Clifton Independent School District is a public school district based in Clifton, Texas (USA).

Located in Bosque County, a small portion of the district extends into Coryell County.

In 2010, the school district was rated "recognized" by the Texas Education Agency.

Schools
Clifton High School (Grades 9-12)
Clifton Middle School (Grades 6-8)
Clifton Elementary School (Grades PreK-5)

Board of Trustees
 John Erickson (President)
 Kenneth Lowrance (Vice President)
 Greg Gloff (Sec./Tres.)
 Damaris Neelley
 John Thiele
 Vicki Gloff
 Jan Woosley

References

External links
Clifton ISD

School districts in Bosque County, Texas
School districts in Coryell County, Texas